The Pizza dolce di Beridde, also called Pizza ebraica or Diamanti Romani, is an unleavened sweet bread typical of the city of Rome. This traditional dessert is prepared by the Roman Jewish community on the occasion of the feast of circumcision.

Etymology
The name Pizza is here to be understood not in the recent meaning that has spread into Italian through the Neapolitan language, but in the original medieval Latin meaning of 'focaccia', and thus suggests, as in the case of the Easter Pizza, an ancient origin of the dish. The term piza in medieval Latin is first attested in 966 in Naples and in 997 in Gaeta, and was also used to designate ceremonial foods cooked for Easter such as Easter Pizzas. Similar preparations ("Pizza alla rustica", "Pizza di Ricotta") are reported in early 19th-century cookery manuals such as Vincenzo Agnoletti's.

The cake's appellation Beridde derives from the Judeo-Roman form of the word Brit milah ("covenant of circumcision" in Hebrew), i.e. the ritual circumcision of male infants in the community.

History
The origins of the dish are obscure, but it is possible that it is a cake brought to Rome by Spanish Jews driven out of Spain in 1492 or by those expelled from Sicily in 1493. This would explain the presence among the ingredients of nuts, sultanas and candied fruit, typical of the cuisine in Muslim countries.

The Pizza ebraica was reportedly Pope Benedict XVI's favorite dessert.

Ingredients
The main ingredients of the bread, which contains neither eggs nor yeast, are flour, sugar, almonds (both whole and ground), raisins, candied fruit (usually candied citron), olive oil or other vegetable oil, white wine and pine nuts.

Preparation
The ingredients are mixed together with wine and lukewarm oil, kneading them to form a kind of soft sweet pastry dough that must not stick to the hands. This is rolled out with the rolling pin to a thickness of about two cm, cut into lozenges or rectangles (the former are called diamanti), and baked in a very hot oven until a crust forms on the surface, while the inside must remain soft.

Religious tradition and sale

A lozenge of the cake is traditionally given to each participant of the circumcision feast at the end of the ceremony. It is contained in a bag of sweets called "kavodde", which means "dignity" in Hebrew and symbolises the commandment to honour one's father and mother.

In addition to being prepared in families for the feast of circumcision, Pizza di Beridde is sold by kosher bakeries like the Pasticceria Boccione in the Ghetto of Rome (in Sant'Angelo rione), along with other traditional Jewish sweets, such as ricotta and sour cherry tart and mostaccioli.

See also
 List of sweet breads

References

Sources
 
 
 

Jewish baked goods
Cuisine of Lazio
Italian breads
Jews and Judaism in Rome